Chestnut Cabaret was a nightclub located at 38th & Ludlow Streets in Philadelphia, Pennsylvania.  It was later named the Blockley before its closure in 2013.

History
Many famous bands played the Chestnut Cabaret including the following:

Albert Collins
Al Stewart
Alex Chilton
Alien Sex Fiend
Albert King
Asleep at the Wheel
Average White Band
Bachman-Turner Overdrive
Barenaked Ladies
Beru Revue
Big Country
Blondie
Blues Traveler
Blue Öyster Cult
Bootsy's Rubber Band
Branford Marsalis
Buddy Guy
Burning Spear
Buster Poindexter
Butthole Surfers
Buzzcocks, 
Camper Van Beethoven
Chris Whitley
Chris Isaak
Collective Soul
Concrete Blonde
The Connells
Consolidated
MC 900 Ft. Jesus
David Bromberg
De La Soul
Dead Milkmen
Debbie Harry
Dee Dee Ramone
Devo
Dirty Dozen Brass Band
Dizzy Gillespie
Donovan
Dread Zeppelin
Dr. John
Electric Love Muffin
Emerson, Lake & Palmer
Fishbone
Gene Loves Jezebel
Gil Scott-Heron
Hardline
The Hooters
House of Love
Hothouse Flowers
Ice-T/Body Count
Jack Bruce/Ginger Baker
Jane Siberry
Jesus Jones
Jesus and Mary Chain
John Lee Hooker
John Entwistle
John Mayall
Johnny Winter
Judy Collins
Kid Creole and the Coconuts
Killing Joke
King's X
Kirsty MacColl
Kitchens of Distinction
Krokus
Larry Carlton
Leon Russell
Little Feat
Living Colour
Marillion
Meat Loaf
Meat Puppets
Midge Ure
Modern English
Mojo Nixon
Naked Raygun
Nine Inch Nails
NRBQ
Parliament-Funkadelic
Phish
Pogues
The Pretenders
Psychic TV
Renaissance (band)
Ramones
Red Hot Chili Peppers
Richard Thompson
Robin Trower
The Roches
Ronnie Montrose
Shriekback
Skinny Puppy
Stanley Clarke
Stanley Jordan
Steel Pulse
Steve Forbert
Sun Ra
The Bears (featuring Adrian Belew)
The Fall
The Fixx
The Radiators
The Replacements
The Tubes
They Might Be Giants
Third World
'til tuesday
Toto
Tower of Power
Violent Femmes
Warren Zevon
Wire
Wynton Marsalis
X
Yellowman

See also

Trocadero Theatre

References

External links
Chestnut Cabaret

Nightclubs in Pennsylvania
Music venues in Philadelphia
University City, Philadelphia
1978 establishments in Pennsylvania
2013 disestablishments in Pennsylvania